William Ross Burgo (November 15, 1919 – October 19, 1988) was a Major League Baseball outfielder who played for the Philadelphia Athletics in 1943 and 1944.  He was a native of Johnstown, Pennsylvania. He batted and threw right-handed.

Burgo is one of many ballplayers who only appeared in the major leagues during World War II. His debut game was on September 22, 1943, and his last game was on June 11, 1944. He hit 26-for-70, a .371 batting average and next season, batted .239 in 27 games.

Career totals include a batting average of .297, 2 home runs, 12 runs batted in, 18 runs, and a slugging percentage of .399.  He made 4 errors in 114 chances (.965).

External links

Major League Baseball outfielders
Baseball players from Pennsylvania
Philadelphia Athletics players
1919 births
1988 deaths
Major League Baseball left fielders
Augusta Tigers players
Beaumont Exporters players
Beaumont Roughnecks players
Beaver Falls Bees players
Johnstown Johnnies players
Lakeland Pilots players
Little Rock Travelers players
Memphis Chickasaws players
Milwaukee Brewers (minor league) players
Muskegon Clippers players
Newport News Builders players
Pensacola Fliers players
Springfield Nationals players
Toledo Mud Hens players
Wilmington Blue Rocks (1940–1952) players